In philately, indicia are markings on a mail piece (as opposed to an adhesive stamp) showing that postage has been prepaid by the sender. Indicia is the plural of the Latin word indicium, meaning distinguishing marks, signs or identifying marks. The term imprinted stamp is used more or less interchangeably, but some indicia are not imprinted stamps. One example is the handstamp, which can be seen in a photo on this page.

Forms of indicia 
Indicia can take a number of forms, including printed designs or handstamps where a stamp would normally be that indicate the pre-payment of postage.  Imprinted stamps on postal stationery are indicia.

The term also refers to a meter stamp impression or the part thereof that indicates the value or postal rate.

See also 

Indicia (publishing)
Information Based Indicia
Postmark

References

External links 
Carnegie Mellon University Computer Science technical reports CMU-CS-96-113: Cryptographic Postage Indicia

Postal systems
Philatelic terminology

sk:Cenina